Per-Erik Hedlund (18 April 1897 – 12 February 1975) was a Swedish cross-country skier. He competed in the 18 and 50 km events at the 1924 and 1928 Olympics and won the gold medal over 50 km in 1928, more than 13 minutes ahead of fellow Swede Gustaf Jonsson. While competing, he wore a show-white outfit, which was later considered as lucky, and was worn by Swedish Nordic skiers at every Winter Olympics for the next 48 years.

Hedlund finished sixth in the 50 km event, but won the 4 × 10 km relay at the 1933 FIS Nordic World Ski Championships. He won the Vasa run in 1926 and 1928. In 1928 Hedlund wanted to share the victory with his best friend Sven Utterström. They crossed the finish line simultaneously, but gave up their medals after the jury decided to award gold to Hedlund. Hedlund won nine individual Swedish Championships over various distances. He received the Svenska Dagbladet Gold Medal in 1928.

In his prime Hedlund worked six days a week in the woods and skied on the seventh.

Cross-country skiing results
All results are sourced from the International Ski Federation (FIS).

Olympic Games
 1 medal – (1 gold)

World Championships
 1 medal – (1 gold)

References

External links
 
 
Wallechinsky, David and Jaime Loucky (2009). "Cross-Country (Nordic) Skiing, Men: 50 Kilometers". In The Complete Book of the Winter Olympics: 2010 Edition. London: Aurum Press Limited. p. 232.

1897 births
1975 deaths
People from Älvdalen Municipality
Cross-country skiers from Dalarna County
Swedish male cross-country skiers
Olympic cross-country skiers of Sweden
Cross-country skiers at the 1924 Winter Olympics
Cross-country skiers at the 1928 Winter Olympics
Olympic gold medalists for Sweden
Vasaloppet winners
Olympic medalists in cross-country skiing
FIS Nordic World Ski Championships medalists in cross-country skiing
Medalists at the 1928 Winter Olympics
Malungs IF skiers
Särna SK skiers
20th-century Swedish people